Bùi Tiến Dũng (born 28 February 1997) is a Vietnamese footballer who plays as goalkeeper for Công An Hà Nội.

Personal life 
He has a younger brother named Bùi Tiến Dụng who is also a footballer. Both participated in the 2018 AFC U-23 Championship. They were both hailed from a middle-class family of Muong ethnicity.

In July 2018, he traveled to Russia to award the "Man of the Match" prize to Croatia's international Ivan Perišić amidst the 2018 FIFA World Cup where Croatia beat England 2–1 in the semi-finals. He became the first ever Vietnamese to award this prize, based on his impressive performance in the U-23 Asian Cup held earlier.

Relationships 

In August 2020, Bui Tien Dung began dating Ukrainian model Dianka Zakhidova. They married on 22nd of May, 2022.

Honours

Club 
FLC Thanh Hóa
V.League 1: Runner-up 2017, 2018
Vietnamese National Cup: Runner-up 2018
Hà Nội
V.League 1: 2019
Vietnamese National Cup: 2019
Vietnamese Super Cup: 2019
Hồ Chí Minh City
Vietnamese Super Cup: Runner-up: 2020
Vietnam 
AFF Championship: 2018
Vietnam U23
AFC U-23 Championship Runners-up  2018
Southeast Asian Games: 2019

References 

1997 births
Living people
Vietnamese footballers
Vietnam international footballers
People from Thanh Hóa province
Association football goalkeepers
V.League 1 players
Footballers at the 2018 Asian Games
2019 AFC Asian Cup players
Competitors at the 2017 Southeast Asian Games
Asian Games competitors for Vietnam
Competitors at the 2019 Southeast Asian Games
Southeast Asian Games medalists in football
Southeast Asian Games gold medalists for Vietnam
Thanh Hóa FC players
Hanoi FC players
Ho Chi Minh City FC players
21st-century Vietnamese people